Bao Xian Fei (born October 4, 1983 in Nanjing, China) is a former wushu taolu athlete and actor from the Netherlands. He is a three-time world champion.

Biography
At the age of 5, Fei started to train with his father, Grandmaster Yuliang Fei, in different wushu styles, including Shaolin and modern forms. His father originally had a successful junior wushu career in China and decided to move to move to the netherlands to spread wushu internationally. At the age of 14, his first major international debut was at the 1997 World Wushu Championships in Rome, Italy, where he won a bronze medal in changquan. Between then and 2005, he won seven more medals at the world championships and was a three-time world champion. He was also a nine-time European champion between 1998 and 2002.

His first film role was a security guard in the 2003 American television production "Second Nature", Alec Baldwin played the lead. In 2004, he played a more important role as "Wong" in "Fighting Fish", the first martial arts production in the Netherlands.

Filmography
Second Nature, USA (TV) 2003
Fighting Fish, NL 2004

References

External links

The Official Bao Xian Fei Website

Chinese wushu practitioners
Dutch wushu practitioners
1983 births
Living people
Sportspeople from Nanjing